Georges Hilbert (1900–1982) was a French sculptor. He became a member of the Académie des Beaux-Arts in 1973.

References

1900 births
1982 deaths
People from Ghazaouet
French sculptors
French male sculptors
Members of the Académie des beaux-arts